The 1990–91 VfL Bochum season was the 53rd season in club history.

Review and events
On 22 April 1991 head coach Reinhard Saftig was sacked and replaced by caretaker Rolf Schafstall.

Matches

Legend

Bundesliga

DFB-Pokal

Intertoto Cup

Squad

Squad and statistics

Squad, appearances and goals scored

Transfers

Summer

In:

Out:

Sources

External links
 1990–91 VfL Bochum season at Weltfussball.de 
 1990–91 VfL Bochum season at kicker.de 
 1990–91 VfL Bochum season at Fussballdaten.de 

Bochum
VfL Bochum seasons